David Scott Wingo (born March 25, 1989) is an American college baseball coach and former professional baseball second baseman. He is currently an Assistant coach for the South Carolina Gamecocks under head coach Mark Kingston. Wingo played college baseball at the University of South Carolina from 2008 to 2011 winning back to back NCAA College World Series titles in 2010 and 2011 under head coach Ray Tanner. He then pursued a professional career from 2011 to 2014.

Playing career
Wingo attended Mauldin High School in Mauldin. He then attended the University of South Carolina, where he played for the South Carolina Gamecocks baseball team. He was named the College World Series Most Outstanding Player for the 2011 College World Series.

Wingo was drafted by the Dodgers in the 11th round (344th overall) in the 2011 Major League Baseball Draft. He started his professional career with the Arizona League Dodgers but after 7 games was promoted to the Ogden Raptors of the Pioneer League. Combined, in 2011, he was in 38 games and hit .296.

Wingo spent his 2012 season with the Rancho Cucamonga Quakes in the California League. He played in 109 games with the Quakes and hit .246. He returned to the Quakes in 2013, and hit .227 in 101 games. Wingo spent 2013 with Rancho Cucamonga, where in 101 games, he hit .227/.371/.336 with 4 HR, 24 RBI and 50 BB. He played mostly second base, but also saw a considerable amount of time at third base.

He was released by the Dodgers on April 12, 2014.

Coaching career
Wingo returned to the University of South Carolina as a student assistant and completed his degree in the spring of 2015. That summer, he coached in the Coastal Plain League. In 2016, he joined the North Greenville University baseball team as a graduate assistant and finished his master's degree. He served as an assistant coach at Jacksonville University. Scott Wingo returned to Columbia, SC Summer 2018. He is currently an assistant coach at The University of South Carolina.

References

External links

1989 births
Living people
South Carolina Gamecocks baseball players
Sportspeople from Greenville, South Carolina
Baseball players from South Carolina
College World Series Most Outstanding Player Award winners
Arizona League Dodgers players
Ogden Raptors players
Rancho Cucamonga Quakes players
Baseball second basemen
People from Mauldin, South Carolina
South Carolina Gamecocks baseball coaches
North Greenville Crusaders baseball coaches
Jacksonville Dolphins baseball coaches
Notre Dame Fighting Irish baseball coaches